is a Japanese animation studio headquartered in Nishi-Tokyo, Tokyo, Japan. The company was founded in April 1972 by producer and director Satoshi Dezaki, and the studio's first work was Shin Kyojin no Hoshi in 1977. In 1983, with Dezaki directing, Magic Bus collaborated in the animation production of Captain. Magic Bus has since become largely an animation subcontractor for other animation studios.

Television series

OVAs/ONAs
Urusei Yatsura OVA (episodes 4–9, 1988–1989)
Wounded Man (1986–1988)
Mahjong Hishō-den: Naki no Ryū (with Gainax, 1988–1990)
Gensei no Shugoshin P-hyoro Ikka (1988)
Cipher the Video (March 3, 1989)
Kasei Yakyoku (March 25 - September 25, 1989)
Riki-Oh (June 25, 1989 - August 24, 1990)
Fujiko F. Fujio's SF (Slightly Mysterious) Short Theater (May 1990 – May 1991, episodes 3–7)
Mad Bull 34 (December 21, 1990 – August 21, 1992)
Burning Blood (April 25, 1990 – April 25, 1991)
Taiman Blues: Ladies-hen Mayumi (1990)
Sword for Truth (December 28, 1990, with Toei Animation)
Carol (March 21, 1990, with Animate Film)
Phantom Yūsha Densetsu (January 24, 1991)
The Gakuen Choujotai (June 27, 1991)
Yūkan Club (July 25, 1991 – December 14, 1991)
Mahjong Hishōden: Naki no Ryū 2 (with GAINAX, 1991)
Christmas in January (November 21, 1991)
Hayō no Ken: Shokkoku no Mashō (1992)
Legend of the Galactic Heroes (1996–1997, episodes 89, 92, 95, 98, 101, 104, 107, and 110)
Dragoon (July 25, 1997 – November 28, 1997)
Toki no Daichi: Hana no Oukoku no Majo (1998–1999)
Legend of the Galactic Heroes: A Hundred Billion Stars, A Hundred Billion Lights (episodes 1–4, 13–14, 20, and 24, 1998)
Legend of the Galactic Heroes: Spiral Labyrinth (1999–2000, episodes 1–14, 16–17, 19–23, and 27–28)
Amai Chōbatsu: Watashi wa Kanshu Senyō Pet (2018)
Araiya-san! Ore to Aitsu ga Onnayu de!? (2019)

Films
Pro Yakyū o 10-bai Tanoshiku Miru Hōhō Part 2 (April 21, 1984)
Tobira o Akete (November 1, 1986)
They Were Eleven (November 1, 1986)
Urusei Yatsura: The Final Chapter (February 6, 1988)
Shirahata no Shōjo Ryūko (July 21, 1988)
Ajin Senshi (November 17, 1990)
Boyfriend (February 11, 1992) - television film
Senbon Matsubara: Kawa to Ikiru Shōnen-tachi (July 11, 1992) - co-produced with Mushi Production
Legend of the Galactic Heroes: Golden Wings (December 12, 1992)
Mii-chan no Tenohira (May 29, 1993) - short film
Big Wars (September 25, 1993)
Aoi Kioku: Manmō Kaitaku to Shōnen-tachi (December 18, 1993)
Legend of the Galactic Heroes: Overture to a New War (December 18, 1993)
Yukiwatari (July 16, 1994) - short film
Bakumatsu no Spasibo (September 20, 1997)
Otoko wa Tsurai yo: Torajirō Wasure na Kusa (August 7, 1998) - television film; co-produced with Eiken
Happy Birthday: Inochi Kagayaku Toki (July 27, 1999)
Inochi no Chikyū: Dioxin no Natsu (August 18, 2001)
Aterui (August 5, 2002)
Yume Kakeru Kougen: Kiyosato no Chichi Paul Rusch (October 19, 2002)
Momoko, Kaeru no Uta ga Kikoeru yo. (July 23, 2003)
Hurdle (January 15, 2005)
Shinshaku Sengoku Eiyū Densetsu Sanada Jū Yūshi The Animation (January 29, 2005) - television film
Glass no Usagi (May 14, 2005)

References

External links
  
 

 
Japanese animation studios
Animation studios in Tokyo
Japanese companies established in 1977
Mass media companies established in 1977
Nishitōkyō, Tokyo